A  (English: 'saint') is a piece of one of various religious art forms found in Spain and areas that were colonies of the Kingdom of Spain, consisting of wooden or ivory statues that depict various saints, angels, or Marian titles, or one of the personages of the Holy Trinity. A  is a craftsperson who makes the image. Some  which have gained greater public devotion among the faithful have also merited papal approval through canonical coronations.   remain a living tradition of religious iconography and folk art in Mexico, the Philippines, Puerto Rico and some other Caribbean islands, South and Central America, and the Southwestern United States, especially New Mexico.

History and terminology
Icons and other religious images were crucial for the conversions of indigenous peoples to the Roman Catholic Church, which was itself an integral part of the Spanish colonisation of the Americas. However, long distances, inefficient methods of transportation, and high demand for such artworks limited the ability of ecclesiastical authorities to supply parish churches, especially those in remote outposts, with works of religious art from the Kingdom of Spain.
 
The practice of creating  began in Spain, where mannequin-style religious images were commonly vested in ornate religious clothing, often expensive and funded by religious devotees. An early known example is the 1555 statue of Infant Jesus of Prague, already vested during the time of Saint Teresa of Avila. Customarily, jewels are various accessories were also added onto larger , a tradition still carried on today. While larger pieces are typically used in churches, many smaller ones are personal or family items of reverence, or kept as decorations.  are also common throughout Latin America, the Spanish Caribbean, and the Southwestern United States, as well as the Philippines, with distinct styles and traditions in each area.

They are usually made of wood. Larger scenic pieces, including multiple statues or done in bas relief, or simply painted on wood panels, and which may include non-figural iconography, are called , originally altar backboards or screens, though today often adapted to secular artistic purposes in the Chicano art movement .

Ivory was often cited as the best and most expensive material for carving . Elephant ivory, especially of African origin, has been restricted or banned from sale, distribution, or commercialization in Mexico, the Philippines, the United States, and many other countries. While exact laws vary by jurisdiction (from total bans to legal sale of antiques only), ivory is now rarely used.

In the Philippines

The  culture in the Philippines is widely prevalent among Filipino Catholics, having been influenced by centuries of Spain colonial rule and various forms of folk Catholicism. The earliest recorded vested  in the Philippines is the Santo Niño de Cebu, a baptismal gift given by Ferdinand Magellan to Rajah Humabon's consort in 1521.

In the Spanish period, only the nobility (such as the ) and the rich could afford to have Santo, due to their elaborate ornamentation and design. From a religious perspective, the practice of owning and maintaining  images are often regarded as a mild Catechism for people, especially with regards to the iconographic attributes attached to specific images.

The most well-known  in the Philippines are often Marian titles, such Our Lady of Manaoag and Our Lady of La Naval de Manila, while those of Jesus Christ are the Santo Niño de Cebu and the Black Nazarene.  (cottonfruit, Sandoricum koetjape) is a favorite material for the figures in the Philippines, as is the wood of Elaeocarpus calomala, while  (Litsea leytensis) wood is highly sought after and more expensive, given its resistance to termites.

In Puerto Rico
The santeros are venerated for their skill especially the ones in the Cordillera Central, who for decades have perfected the skill of making religious icons. A fourth-generation artist, Celestino Avilés Meléndez, from Orocovis has created pieces for the Vatican in Rome and a Cathedral in Brooklyn, New York.

In 1953, 171  wooden statues from Puerto Rico were exhibited at the Cooper Union Museum for the Arts in New York.

In the United States 

The tradition of wooden  carving was preserved as a folk art in Northern New Mexico and Southern Colorado, where isolated villages remain relatively secluded to this day.  Of particular note is the village of Cordova, New Mexico which has produced several well-known ; one was George López, who was awarded the National Heritage Fellowship by the National Endowment for the Arts in 1982.

They are typically , without many if any accessories (that is, with clothing and the like carved and painted on the statuettes, though often bearing a separate wooden staff or other bit of regalia). They are most often made of cottonwood, pine or aspen. Many are multi-piece, with hands, head, and other details carved separately and added to a body that is otherwise carved from single block of wood. Nevertheless, the region also has a long tradition of larger, articulated, and often bloody Crucifixion . Some contemporary  still use paints from homemade pigments.

One such  figurine, by Santa Fe  Frank Brito Sr. (1922–2005) is in the permanent collection of the Smithsonian Museum of American Art since 1997; many more traditional  and other carvings by him are in the Museum of International Folk Art, along with those of other  from various parts of the world. Entire Nativity scenes in  style are also popular tourist items.

New Mexico is known for its tradition of santos. Sibling santos painters, Bernadette Vigil and Frederico Vigil of Santa Fe, though of different styles are both known as "masters of the art of buon fresco which Bernadette has created for commissions by churches.

Attire and accessories

The wardrobe items of more elaborate , especially  mannequins, are often expensive, such as pieces woven with gold thread.

These are never used for any other subject, and are interpreted to mean various things, such as Christ's three faculties of will, memory, and understanding. Some female saints, particularly virgin martyrs, don diadems or tiaras; female saints are also usually given a parure or other jewellery from earrings, to necklaces, rings, and bracelets.

These adornments are sometimes gold-plated for a richer effect. The costliest of crowns are those made of solid sterling silver or gold, and are often reserved for images owned by wealthy clerics and cathedrals.

Another costly item involved in the maintenance of a large  is its  (carriage), used as the image's vehicle during religious processions in rural Mexico and the Philippines, such as those of a town fiesta, and Holy Week. These often have embossed metal decorations, the most expensive being pure silver, and layered cloths forming a skirt to hide the wheels of the carriage, along with carved sides representing episodes from the Gospels, such as the Passion narrative, or scenes, symbols, and objects associated with the saint.

Notable people
 

Virginia Romero (born 1952), a master artist of traditional New Mexican santero

References

External links
"Santos" at the Getty Thesaurus of Art and Architecture
Contemporary bultos at Museum of New Mexico

Visual arts genres
Folk art
Art in New Mexico
Catholic art
Christian iconography